α-Viniferin is a stilbene trimer. It can be isolated from Caragana chamlagu and from Caragana sinica and from the stem bark of Dryobalanops aromatica. It is also present in relation to resistance to Botrytis cinerea and Plasmopara viticola in Vitis vinifera and Vitis riparia.It has been shown to inhibit acetylcholinesterase.

References 

Resveratrol oligomers
Acetylcholinesterase inhibitors